Yin Congyao (born 4 March 1997) is a Chinese footballer who currently plays for Chinese Super League side Meizhou Hakka.

Club career
Yin joined Slovak First Football League club AS Trenčín in the summer of 2015. On 13 October 2015, he made his debut for the club in a 3–0 away win against fourth-tier club Jaslovské Bohunice in the 2015–16 Slovak Cup, coming on as a substitute for Denis Jančo in the half time. He mainly played for Trenčín's satellite team Nemšová of 3. Liga in the 2015–16 and 2016–17 season. Yin was released by the club in January 2017.

Yin returned to China and joined China League One side Nei Mongol Zhongyou. He registered to play in League One in July 2017. He made his debut for the club on 21 August 2017 in a 2–0 home win against Meizhou Hakka, coming on for Zhang Tianlong in the injury time.

On 10 January 2018, Yin transferred to Chinese Super League side Chongqing Dangdai Lifan. On 3 March 2018, he made his Super League debut in a 1–0 home win against Beijing Renhe, coming on as a substitute for Alan Kardec in the 88th minute. He would leave leave the team after the club was dissolved on 24 May 2022 after the majority owner, Wuhan Dangdai Group could not restructure the clubs shareholdings and debt.

He would join the newly promoted Meizhou Hakka and would go on to make his debut in a league game on 4 June 2022 against Tianjin Jinmen Tiger in a 1-1 draw.

Career statistics
.

References

External links
 

1997 births
Living people
Chinese footballers
Chinese expatriate footballers
People from Huangshi
Footballers from Hubei
AS Trenčín players
FK Slovan Nemšová players
3. Liga (Slovakia) players
Inner Mongolia Zhongyou F.C. players
Chongqing Liangjiang Athletic F.C. players
Chinese Super League players
China League One players
China League Two players
Association football midfielders
Expatriate footballers in Slovakia
Chinese expatriate sportspeople in Slovakia
Meizhou Hakka F.C. players